One for all may refer to:

 One for all, all for one (Unus pro omnibus, omnes pro uno), the motto of Dumas' Three Musketeers, and the traditional motto of Switzerland

Film and television
 One for All (film) or The President's Mystery, a 1936 American film directed by Phil Rosen
 One 4 All (Une pour toutes), a 2000 French film directed by Claude Lelouch
 "One for All" (He-Man and the Masters of the Universe), a television episode
 One For All, a Quirk in the manga and anime series My Hero Academia

Music
 One for All (band), an American jazz group formed in 1997
 One for All (Art Blakey album) or the title song, 1990
 One for All (Brand Nubian album), 1990
 One for All (Kazumi Watanabe album) or the title song, 1999
 One for All (Peter Criss album) or the title song, 2007
 One for All (Raven album), 2000
 "One for All", a song by Krokus from Rock the Block

Other uses
 One for All, a brand name for some JP1 remote controls
 One for All (foaled 1966), American Thoroughbred racehorse, sired by Northern Dancer

See also
 One for All – All for One, an album by Galneryus
 All for One (disambiguation)